Taqwacore is a subgenre of punk music dealing with Islam.  It may also refer to:

The Taqwacores, a 2003 novel by Michael Muhammad Knight
The Taqwacores (film), a 2010 film adaptation of the novel, directed by Eyad Zahra
Taqwacore (film), a 2009 documentary film by Omar Majeed